Lateral epicondyle can refer to:
 Lateral epicondyle of the humerus (dorsal epicondyle in birds)
 Lateral epicondyle of the femur